Rangemore is a rural locality in the Shire of Burdekin, Queensland, Australia. In the  Rangemore had a population of 3 people.

Geography
The predominant land use is grazing on native vegetation with small areas of crop growing.

History
In the  Rangemore had a population of 3 people.

References 

Shire of Burdekin
Localities in Queensland